Rafael Robayo (born April 24, 1984) is a Colombian footballer who plays as a midfielder for Atlético Bucaramanga.

Career

Atletico Nacional
Robayo began his youth career at  Escuela de Fútbol Vida. In 2003, he joined top Colombian club Atlético Nacional and made his first team debut.

Millonarios FC
In early 2005 Robayo joined Millonarios and on May 15 of that year scored his first professional goal in a 1-1 draw with Atlético Nacional in Medellín.

In 2006 Robayo lost his place for Millonarios but in 2007 he bounced back to claim a starting role in midfield as a result of his fine form during the Copa Sudamericana 2007 in which the club advanced to the semifinal stage. After the departure of Gerardo Bedoya in early 2010, Robayo has served as club captain alternating with José Mera. On October 24, 2010 Robayo recorded his first two-goal game as Millonarios defeated Deportivo Pereira by a 2-1 score.

Robayo continued his fine form in 2011 as he helped the club win the 2011 Copa Colombia by a 2-0 aggregate score over Boyacá Chicó. After seven seasons at the club on January 4, 2012 Robayo announced that he would be leaving the club.

Chicago
A day later it was revealed that Robayo would be joining Chicago Fire in Major League Soccer.

Millonarios FC
On July 26, 2012, after half a season in Chicago, Robayo was loaned back to Millonarios for the remainder of the 2012 season.

On May 3, 2015 he scored the final goal on a 3-1 win against Medellin on the  92nd minute scoring by avoiding the opponent goalkeeper, making him Man of the Match.
He also scored in a 1-3 win against Santa Fe in the last game of the season, thus eliminating them from the quarterfinals and qualifying his team.

He is currently the eighth player with more presences in Millonarios with over 300 games where converted 31 goals.

 Fact: He is the player from Bogota with more matches on the team and eighth all time with 334.

Statistics
(As of September 16, 2015)

References

External links
 
 Official Webpage
 
 
 
 

1984 births
Living people
Colombian footballers
Colombian expatriate footballers
Colombia international footballers
Atlético Nacional footballers
Once Caldas footballers
Millonarios F.C. players
Chicago Fire FC players
Patriotas Boyacá footballers
Deportes Tolima footballers
Atlético Bucaramanga footballers
Expatriate soccer players in the United States
Categoría Primera A players
Major League Soccer players
Association football midfielders
Footballers from Bogotá